Solero is a comune (municipality) in the Province of Alessandria in the Italian region Piedmont, located about  east of Turin and about  west of Alessandria.  It borders the following municipalities: Alessandria, Felizzano, Oviglio, and Quargnento.

People
Solero was the birthplace of:
Saint Bruno of Segni (c.1047–1123), bishop of Segni and abbot of Montecassino 
Carlo Guasco (1813–1876) opera singer

References 

Solero, Piedmont